Xiang Chong is a fictional character in Water Margin, one of the Four Great Classical Novels in Chinese literature. Nicknamed "Eight-armed Nezha", he ranks 64th among the 108 Stars of Destiny and 28th among the 72 Earthly Fiends.

Background
Xiang Chong fights with an iron spear and a shield whose front is carved with a beast head. He also carries 24 daggers which he throws with accuracy. Because he is a versatile warrior, he is nicknamed "Eight-armed Nezha" after the Chinese deity who could sprout additional two heads and four arms at will.  He and Li Gun are sidekicks of Fan Rui, who leads a 3,000-strong outlaw band at Mount Mangdang (芒碭山; north of present-day Yongcheng, Henan).

Joining Liangshan
The three chiefs of Mount Mangdang have been boasting about wiping out the Liangshan stronghold. Their brag angers Liangshan, which sends Shi Jin to subdue them. But Shi could not hold up against the assault of Xiang Chong and Li Gun, who bear down on his men with speed and ferocity, causing heavy casualties. Song Jiang arrives with reinforcement. 

The following day, when both sides face off again, Gongsun Sheng arrays the Liangshan troops in the pattern of the Eight Trigrams Formation. Fan Rui, who knows sorcery, assists Xiang Chong and Li Gun in their attack by unsettling the other side with blasting winds and flying pebbles. But Gongsun engulfs Xiang and Li in darkness, trapping them in the formation and driving them into a pit. Meanwhile, Song Jiang's force swarms forward, beating Fan back to his base.

Song Jiang treats the two captives with respect and convinces them to join Liangshan. The two return to Mount Mangdang and successfully help to recruit Fan Rui.

Campaigns and death
Xiang Chong is appointed as one of the leaders of the Liangshan infantry after 108 Stars of Destiny came together in what is called the Grand Assembly. He participates in the campaigns against the Liao invaders and rebel forces in Song territory following amnesty from Emperor Huizong for Liangshan.

In the attack on Muzhou (睦州; in present-day Hangzhou, Zhejiang) in the campaign against Fang La, Xiang Chong and Li Gun encounter the enemy general Zheng Biao. Zheng uses his lasso to trip Xiang and then kills him before he could get on his feet.

References
 
 
 
 
 
 
 

72 Earthly Fiends
Fictional characters from Jiangsu